(Histone-H3)-lysine-36 demethylase (JHDM1A, JmjC domain-containing histone demethylase 1A, H3-K36-specific demethylase, histone-lysine (H3-K36) demethylase, histone demethylase, protein-6-N,6-N-dimethyl-L-lysine,2-oxoglutarate:oxygen oxidoreductase) is an enzyme with systematic name protein-N6,N6-dimethyl-L-lysine,2-oxoglutarate:oxygen oxidoreductase. This enzyme catalyses the following chemical reaction

 protein N6,N6-dimethyl-L-lysine + 2 2-oxoglutarate + 2 O2  protein L-lysine + 2 succinate + 2 formaldehyde + 2 CO2 (overall reaction)
(1a) protein N6,N6-dimethyl-L-lysine + 2-oxoglutarate + O2  protein N6-methyl-L-lysine + succinate + formaldehyde + CO2
(1b) protein N6-methyl-L-lysine + 2-oxoglutarate + O2  protein L-lysine + succinate + formaldehyde + CO2

(Histone-H3)-lysine-36 demethylase contains iron(II).

References

External links 
 

EC 1.14.11
Epigenetics
Post-translational modification